This is a list of publicly accessible, motorable passes in the Gauteng Province, South Africa.
See Mountain Passes of South Africa

Gauteng
Mountain passes
Mountain passes of Gauteng
Mountain passes of Gauteng